Stefan Jürgen Krämer (born 23 March 1967) is a German professional football manager, who last managed SV Meppen.

Career
Krämer was a rather unknown coach in German regional football, when, at the age of 44, he became the assistant manager of Arminia Bielefeld. Arminia began that season with only five points out of ten matches, so that the manager Markus von Ahlen who had brought Krämer to Arminia before had to leave and Stefan Krämer became Arminias interim manager. Because of his surprising success he became Arminias main manager later on. In his first season Arminia still had some weak phases but in the 2012–13 season he managed Arminias qualification for the 2. Bundesliga. He also managed Arminias qualification for the second round of the DFB-Pokal twice. Thus, he had become very popular in Bielefeld and developed a high identification with the club (including a huge tattoo on his chest). From September 2013 onwards, Arminia played a very weak season, so that Krämer was dismissed in February 2014. He finished with a record of 42 wins, 23 draws, and 27 losses. Also in Cottbus he was complimented for his high commitment but had to leave because the weak beginning of his second season there. He finished with a record of 17 wins, 14 draws, and 18 losses with Energie Cottbus.

He was appointed as the head coach of Rot-Weiß Erfurt on 30 December 2015. On 2 October 2017, he was sacked.

In March 2018 he replaced Michael Wiesinger as manager of KFC Uerdingen. He was sacked on 28 January 2019.

He joined 1. FC Magdeburg for the 2019–20 season. He was sacked on 22 December 2019.

He returned to Uerdingen on 10 March 2020. On 13 April 2021, he was sacked.

In early June 2021, Krämer became the new head coach of Belgian Jupiler Pro League team Eupen. He was fired on 16 Februar 2022 after a string of poor results. In the summer of 2022, he was signed by SV Meppen. In March 2023, he was sacked.

Career record

References

External links

1967 births
Living people
Sportspeople from Mainz
German football managers
Arminia Bielefeld managers
FC Energie Cottbus managers
FC Rot-Weiß Erfurt managers
KFC Uerdingen 05 managers
1. FC Magdeburg managers
K.A.S. Eupen managers
SV Meppen managers
Belgian Pro League managers
3. Liga managers
Footballers from Rhineland-Palatinate
Association football midfielders
German footballers
Expatriate football managers in Belgium